Aetheorhiza is a genus of flowering plants in the daisy family described as a genus in 1827.

There is only one known species, Aetheorhiza bulbosa, the tuberous hawk's-beard, native to Europe and the Mediterranean.

References

Monotypic Asteraceae genera
Flora of Europe